The 1st Ukrainian Front, previously the Voronezh Front, was a major formation of the Soviet Army during World War II, being equivalent to a Western army group.

Background
During the first months of the war, officers from 16 regions of Ukraine conscripted about 2.5 million people from military enlistment offices. 1.3 million militiamen from the left-bank and southern regions of Ukraine fought against the enemy. In 1941, about 3.185 million citizens of the Ukrainian SSR were sent to the Soviet Red Army and Navy. Replenishing mostly the units of the Southern and Southwestern fronts, the Ukrainian people formed the basis of the 37th, 38th, and 40th armies; and the 13th and 17th rifle divisions. Due to the conscription of civilians, the proportion of Ukrainian citizens fighting in south-west Ukraine reached 50%. This significantly exceeded the percentage of Ukrainians from the army as a whole.

From 1943 to 1944, the Red Army recruited more than 3 million people, which was 10% of the total population of Ukraine, although in the Volyn region, this figure was 16%. Ukrainians accounted for 60–80% of Soviet Red Army soldiers in the 1st to 4th Ukrainian Fronts.

The Ukrainian people were conscripted to join all four Ukrainian fronts, and this process lasted until the end of 1944. According to Vladislav Hrynevych, in the summer of 1943 in the Donetsk region 12,860 people were called up and conscripted by advancing units. In Sumy region - 24,031 people were recruited. Military enlistment offices were also established in liberated Ukrainian areas to enlist those who avoided conscription by the army. According to researchers, during 1943-1945 about 4.5 million Ukrainians became Red Army soldiers. After June 1944, almost 40% of the Soviet Red Army consisted of Ukrainians. The losses of the Ukrainian people during World War Two account for 19-35% of the total losses of the USSR.

Wartime
The Voronezh front was established at the end of June 1942 when tanks of the German Wehrmacht's 6th Army reached Voronezh during the early stages of Operation Blau. It was split off the earlier Bryansk Front in order to better defend the Voronezh region. The name indicated the primary geographical region in which the front first fought, based on the town of Voronezh on the Don River. 

The Voronezh Front participated in the Battle of Voronezh, the defensive operations on the approaches to Stalingrad, and in the December 1942 Operation Saturn, the follow-on to the encirclement of the German 6th Army at Stalingrad where it destroyed the Hungarian Second Army. Following Operation Saturn, the front was involved in Operation Star, which included the Third Battle of Kharkov, which resulted in a long battle from 2 February to 23 March 1943, and the reversal of much of the Soviet gains by the Germans. During Zvezda the front included the 38th, 40th, 60th, and 69th Armies plus the 3rd Tank Army, resulting in the reorganisation of the 3rd Tank Army as the 57th Army due to its destruction. In the Battle of Kursk in August 1943, the front operated on the southern shoulder, during which it commanded the Battle of Prokhorovka on the Soviet side.

During Operation Polkovodets Rumyantsev, which began on August 3, 1943, the front included 38th, 40th, 27th Armies; the 6th and 5th Guards; and the 1st and 5th Guards Tank Armies. During this battle both the 1st and 5th Guards Tank Armies made their main effort in the 5th Guards Army sector, and succeeded eventually in liberating both Belgorod and Kharkov. One of the divisions in the 5th Guards Army was the 13th Guards Rifle Division. The front also fought in the subsequent liberation of eastern Ukraine.

On October 20, 1943, the Voronezh Front was renamed to the 1st Ukrainian Front. This name change reflected the westward advance of the Red Army in its campaign against the German Wehrmacht, leaving Russian Soviet Federative Socialist Republic behind and moving into Ukrainian Soviet Socialist Republic. During 1944, the front participated with other fronts in the battles of Korsun-Shevchenkivskyy, and the battle of Hube's Pocket in Ukraine. It conducted the Lviv-Sandomierz Offensive, during which the Front was controlling the Soviet 1st Guards Tank Army, 3rd Guards Tank Army, 4th Tank Army, 3rd Guards, 5th Guards Army, 13th, 38th, and 60th Armies and 1st Guards Cavalry Corps. It then took part in the battle for Ternopil'. The front participated or conducted battles in Ukraine, Poland, Germany, and Czechoslovakia during 1944 and 1945. The 1st Ukrainian often spearheaded the whole Eastern front. The 1st Ukrainian and the 1st Belorussian fronts were the largest and most powerful of all Soviet fronts as they had the objective of reaching Berlin and ending the war.

In 1945 the front participated in the Vistula-Oder offensive, and conducted the Silesian and Prague Operations, and the siege of Breslau. It also participated in the Berlin operations in Germany and Poland. The front also conducted the major part of the Halbe Encirclement, in which most of the German 9th Army was destroyed south of Berlin. By this time the Polish Second Army was operating as part of the Front. Finally 1st Ukrainian Front provided the defence against the counter-attacks by Armee Wenck which aimed to relieve Berlin and the 9th Army, later uniting with the Americans on the Elbe River. The front then completed the Prague Offensive which became the final battle of World War II in Europe ,therefore ending the war.

Following the war, the Front headquarters formed the Central Group of Forces of the Red Army in Austria and Hungary till 1955, and re-instituted in 1968 in Czechoslovakia as a legacy of the Prague Spring events.

Commanders
 Filipp Golikov (1942)
 General Nikolai F. Vatutin (October 1943 – March 1944)
 Marshal Georgy K. Zhukov (March – May 1944)
 Marshal Ivan S. Konev (May 1944 – May 1945)

Armies
The armies that were part of the 1st Ukrainian Front included:
 1st Guards Cavalry Corps (1943-1945)
 27th Army (1943–44) (2nd Ukrainian Front)
 38th Army (1943–44) (4th Ukrainian Front)
 40th Army (1943–44) (2nd Ukrainian Front)
 47th Army (1943-43) (2nd Belorussian Front)
 60th Army (1943–44) (4th Ukrainian Front)
 3rd Guards Tank Army (1943–45) (Group of Soviet Forces in Germany)
 13th Army (1943–45) (Carpathian Military District)
 2nd Air Army (1943–?) ?

Later composition
 5th Guards Army
 2nd Polish Army
 52nd Army
 4th Guards Tank Army
 28th Army
 31st Army
 3rd Guards Army

References

 Konev, I.S. Aufzeichnungen eines Frontbefehlshabers
 Konev, I.S. Das Jahr 1945
 Ziemke, E.F. Stalingrad to Berlin
 Tissier, Tony Slaughter at Halbe
 Duffy, Christopher Red Storm on the Reich
 Antill, P., Battle for Berlin: April – May 1945.
Erickson, John 'Road to Stalingrad' (1983, 1999) 
 Ericksson, John 'Road to Berlin' (1983, 1999)
Glantz, David 'From the Don to the Dnepr', Frank Cass (1991)
 Nemeskürty, I. 'Untergang einer Armee'
 Ziemke, E.F. 'Stalingrad to Berlin'

Further reading
1st Ukrainian Front on Unithistory

U